Hebron Township is a township in Kossuth County, Iowa, United States.

History
Hebron Township was established in 1889.

References

Townships in Kossuth County, Iowa
Townships in Iowa
1889 establishments in Iowa
Populated places established in 1889